Tin Omen may refer to:

Tin Omen (band), a UK-based band
Tin Omen (song), 1989 single by the Skinny Puppy from the album Rabies